Philip Langmead (c. 1739 – 8 August 1816) was Member of Parliament for Plymouth from 1802 to February 1806.

He married Elizabeth Clark in c. 1763. His daughter Elizabeth was the first wife of George Byng, 6th Viscount Torrington.

References

1816 deaths
Members of the Parliament of the United Kingdom for Plymouth
UK MPs 1802–1806
Year of birth uncertain